Dirt is the second studio album from Welsh rock band Kids in Glass Houses, released on 29 March 2010 through Roadrunner Records. The album was recorded during mid-2009 at Sonic Boom Ranch Studios in Texas with Jason Perry and at Long Wave Studios in Wales with Smart Casual producer Romesh Dodangoda. The lead single from the album was "Young Blood (Let It Out)" and was released on 4 October 2009. The second single from the album is "Matters At All" and was released on 31 January 2010.

The track "Hunt The Haunted" was released as a free download on 8 January 2010. The entire album was available to stream on their MySpace page for a limited time.

The album reached #15 on the UK midweek chart 2 days after its release and officially charted in its first week at #27 selling 8,400.

Track listing

Reception

The reception for this album has been mixed to positive This Is Fake DIY gave a positive review stating "Will it equal ‘Smart Casual's success in the charts? No: it will eclipse it. Believe us when we say that this lot have a potential top 10 smash on their hands, and there is a real possibility of the new album blowing a hole in the wall if enough people catch on."

BBC's Mike Diver gave another positive review by saying "Dirt is poised to take them from support slots with Lostprophets and Paramore to headline performances at the nation’s larger venues.". And praised the album and the band more by stating like many others have "But the overall progression from record one to two is impressive and "As another highlight sings: "the best is yet to come."

NME mostly criticized the album for the guest performers, saying that "those two death-by-cringe tracks unravel (Undercover Lover and Maybe Tomorrow)" but had certain praise calling it an "impressive attempt".

In popular culture

The song "The Best Is Yet to Come" is featured in the video game F1 2010.

Personnel
Kids in Glass Houses
Aled Phillips – lead vocals
Joel Fisher – rhythm guitar
Iain Mahanty – lead guitar, backing vocals
Andrew Shay – bass guitar
Phil Jenkins – drums, percussion

Additional Personnel
Romesh Dodangoda – production on "Hunt the Haunted", engineering on "The Best Is Yet to Come", "Lilli Rose", "Giving Up", "For Better or Hearse", "Undercover Lover", "Maybe Tomorrow", "The Morning Afterlife" and "Hunt the Haunted"
Craig Hardy – programming on all tracks
Ted Jensen – mastering on all tracks
John Mitchell – mixing on all tracks, piano on "The Morning Afterlife"
Michael Morgan – engineering on all tracks except "Hunt the Haunted" 
New Found Glory – vocals on "Maybe Tomorrow"
Cyrus Bolooki
Chad Gilbert
Ian Grushka
Steve Klein
Jordan Pundik
Jason Perry – programming, production on all tracks except "Hunt the Haunted", engineering on all tracks except "Hunt the Haunted"
Frankie Sandford – vocals on "Undercover Lover"
4Strings+ – strings on "The Morning Afterlife", brass on "For Better or Hearse"
Jake Everitt-Crockford – violin
Alison Donnelly – violin
Rachael Elliot – violin
Sarah Elstone – violin
Katherine Evans – violin
Andy Everton – trumpet
Lizzie French – violin
Jennifer Grieve – cello
James Grindle – viola
Lizzie Harris – cello
Jo Lihou – violin
Barbara Lowenberg – violin
Neil Martin – trumpet
Azita Mehdinejad – violin
Clara Pascall – cello
Roz Pilgrim – viola
Louisa Rich – violin
Jessica Rochman – violin
Kay Russant – violin
Claire Sanderson – viola
Hannah Simmons – violin
Alex Tyson – viola
Yonathan Van den Brink – viola
Rachel Williams – cello

References

Kids in Glass Houses albums
2010 albums
Albums produced by Romesh Dodangoda
Albums recorded at Sonic Ranch